Augite is a common rock-forming  pyroxene mineral with formula . The crystals are monoclinic and prismatic. Augite has two prominent cleavages, meeting at angles near 90 degrees.

Characteristics

Augite is a solid solution in the pyroxene group. Diopside and hedenbergite are important endmembers in augite, but augite can also contain significant aluminium, titanium, and sodium and other elements. The calcium content of augite is limited by a miscibility gap between it and pigeonite and orthopyroxene: when occurring with either of these other pyroxenes, the calcium content of augite is a function of temperature and pressure, but mostly of temperature, and so can be useful in reconstructing temperature histories of rocks. With declining temperature, augite may exsolve lamellae of pigeonite and/or orthopyroxene. There is also a miscibility gap between augite and omphacite, but this gap occurs at higher temperatures. There are no industrial or economic uses for this mineral.

Locations
Augite is an essential mineral in mafic igneous rocks; for example, gabbro and basalt and common in ultramafic rocks. It also occurs in relatively high-temperature metamorphic rocks such as mafic granulite and metamorphosed iron formations. It commonly occurs in association with orthoclase, sanidine, labradorite, olivine, leucite, amphiboles and other pyroxenes.

Occasional specimens have a shiny appearance that give rise to the mineral's name, which is from the Greek augites, meaning "brightness", although ordinary specimens have a dull (dark green, brown or black) luster. It was named by Abraham Gottlob Werner in 1792.

See also
 Fassaite

References

Further reading

 Deer, W. A., Howie, R. A., and Zussman, J. (1992). An introduction to the rock-forming minerals (2nd ed.). Harlow: Longman 

Sodium minerals
Calcium minerals
Magnesium minerals
Iron minerals
Pyroxene group
Monoclinic minerals
Minerals in space group 15
Gemstones